Kavualedurga Fort (Kannada ಕವಲೇದುರ್ಗದ ಕೋಟೆ) is a 9th-century fort  from Thirthahalli, Shimoga.It was the fourth and last capital of Keladi kingdom.

History
The fort was built in the 9th century, and it was renovated in the 14th century by Cheluvarangappa. Kavaledurga, also called Bhuvanagiri, was a stronghold of the Nayakas of Keladi, who were the feudatories under the Vijayaanagara rulers and later became independent after the fall of the Vijayanagara kingdom.

Venkatappa Nayaka (1582-1629) fortified the place here. Built a palace and made it an Agrahara with a Mahattina Matha. A Sringeri Matha. A treasury, a granary, stables for elephants and horses and ponds. The fort at Kavaledurga has three lines of walls, which are constructed of huge granite blocks following the natural contour of the hillock. Each fortification has a gateway flanked by guard- rooms on either side In between the fortifications there are temples, a ruined palace site and basement of structures.

At the summit of the hill almost at the centre overlooking the western sea is a small temple popularly known as Shikhareshvara or Srikanthesvara temple. The Srikanthesvara temple on plan has a Garbhagriha. A Nandi mantapa and an entrance porch commanding a fine view of the setting sun beyond the western horizon. There is also a ruins of kashi vishwanath temple.

The palace site within the fort has ornate basement of a large terraced structure. Recent clearance in the area has laid bare series of interconnected rooms enclosing a spacious inner quadrangle this is provided with a frontal spacious pillared Verandah A pooja room, kitchen with, five burner oven in stone, stone platform in the bath room with well developed water supply system, a large closed verandah leading to a stepped tank provide an insight into the palace architecture of the place.

Nearby Places 
 Thirthahalli
 Kundapur
 Kodachadri
 Udupi
 Ambutheertha
 Shivamogga
 Nagara fort
 Jog falls
 Kunchikal Falls
 Agumbe
 Hulikal
 Kundadri
 Kuppalli

References

External links

Buildings and structures completed in the 9th century
Forts in Karnataka
Buildings and structures in Shimoga district
Nayakas of Keladi